Cyril Špendla (born 22 August 1979 in Šaľa) is a former Slovak football defender who recently played for club MFK Dubnica.

References

1979 births
Living people
Slovak footballers
Association football defenders
FK Slovan Duslo Šaľa players
MŠK Žilina players
FK Dubnica players
Slovak Super Liga players
Sportspeople from Šaľa